Donato Nardiello (born 9 April 1957) is a Welsh former international footballer.

He began his career as an apprentice with Coventry City, and signed a professional contract in 1977. The 1978-79 saw Donato playing in a Coventry's side containing Tommy Hutchison, Mick Ferguson, Ian Wallace, Terry Yorath, Graham Oakey, Bobby MacDonald and Jim Blyth. During his first season with the Sky Blues, he played twice for the Welsh international side.

Nardiello later played in the North American Soccer League between 1980 and 1981 for the Detroit Express and the Washington Diplomats.

Personal
He is the father of Daniel Nardiello who plays for Bangor City, the brother of Gerry Nardiello, and also an uncle of Reis Ashraf, an English-born footballer representing the Pakistan national football team.

References

External links
NASL career stats

1957 births
People from Cardigan, Ceredigion
Coventry City F.C. players
Welsh footballers
Welsh expatriate footballers
Wales international footballers
Welsh people of Italian descent
Living people
North American Soccer League (1968–1984) players
Detroit Express players
Washington Diplomats (NASL) players
Nuneaton Borough F.C. players
Expatriate soccer players in the United States
Welsh expatriate sportspeople in the United States
Association football forwards